The 2013 Košice Open is a professional tennis tournament played on clay courts. It is the eleventh edition of the tournament which is part of the 2013 ATP Challenger Tour. It takes place in Košice, Slovakia between 10 and 16 June 2013.

Singles main draw entrants

Seeds

 1 Rankings are as of May 27, 2013.

Other entrants
The following players received wildcards into the singles main draw:
  Marco Daniš
  Djordje Djokovic
  Miloslav Mečíř Jr.
  Adam Pavlásek

The following players received entry from the qualifying draw:
  Damir Džumhur
  Volodymyr Uzhylovskyi
  Maximilian Neuchrist
  Carlos Gómez-Herrera

Champions

Singles

 Mikhail Kukushkin  def.  Damir Džumhur,  6–4, 1–6, 6–2

Doubles

 Kamil Čapkovič /  Igor Zelenay def.  Gero Kretschmer /  Alexander Satschko, 6–4, 7–6(7–5)

External links
Official website

Kosice Open
Košice Open
Kos